Buddhism was known in the pre-Christian Greek world through the campaigns of Alexander the Great (see Greco-Buddhism and Greco-Buddhist monasticism), and several prominent early Christian fathers, including  Clement of Alexandria and St. Jerome, were  aware of the Buddha, even mentioning him in their works. However, the majority of modern scholars who have studied both Buddhism and Christianity hold that there is no direct historical evidence of any influence by Buddhism on early Christianity. Scholars generally consider any such influence implausible given that first century Jews are highly unlikely to have been open to far eastern concepts that appeared opposed to some of their basic beliefs.

Some historians such as Jerry H. Bentley and Elaine Pagels suggest that there is a possibility that Buddhism influenced the early development of Christianity.

There have also been suggestions of an indirect path in which Indian Buddhism may have influenced Gnosticism and then Christianity.  Some scholars hold that the suggested similarities are coincidental since parallel traditions may emerge in different cultures.

Despite suggestions of surface level analogies, Buddhism and Christianity have inherent and fundamental differences at the deepest levels, such as monotheism's place at the core of Christianity and Buddhism's orientation towards non-theism.

In the East, the syncretism between Nestorian Christianity and Buddhism was deep and widespread along the Silk Road, and was especially pronounced in the medieval Church of the East in China. There are also historical documents showing the syncretic nature of Christianity and Buddhism in Asia such as the Jesus Sutras and Nestorian Stele.

Early Christianity

Suggestions of influence
Will Durant, noting that the Emperor Ashoka sent missionaries, not only to elsewhere in India and to Sri Lanka, but to Syria, Egypt and Greece, first speculated in the 1930s that they may have helped prepare the ground for Christian teaching. Buddhism was prominent in the eastern Greek world (Greco-Buddhism) and became the official religion of the eastern Greek successor kingdoms to Alexander the Great's empire (Greco-Bactrian Kingdom (250 BC-125 BC) and Indo-Greek Kingdom (180 BC - 10 CE)).  Several prominent Greek Buddhist missionaries are known (Mahadharmaraksita and Dharmaraksita) and the Indo-Greek king Menander I converted to Buddhism, and is regarded as one of the great patrons of Buddhism.  (See Milinda Panha.) Some modern historians have suggested that the pre-Christian monastic order in Egypt of the Therapeutae is possibly a deformation of the Pāli word "Theravāda," a form of Buddhism, and the movement may have "almost entirely drawn (its) inspiration from the teaching and practices of Buddhist asceticism". They may even have been descendants of Asoka's emissaries to the West. It is true that Buddhist gravestones from the Ptolemaic period have also been found in Alexandria in Egypt, decorated with depictions of the Dharma wheel, showing the Buddhists were living in Hellenistic Egypt at the time Christianity began. The presence of Buddhists in Alexandria has led one author to note: "It was later in this very place that some of the most active centers of Christianity were established".
The early church father Clement of Alexandria (died 215 AD) was also aware of Buddha, writing in his Stromata (Bk I, Ch XV): "The Indian gymnosophists are also in the number, and the other barbarian philosophers. And of these there are two classes, some of them called Sarmanæ and others Brahmins. And those of the Sarmanæ who are called "Hylobii" neither inhabit cities, nor have roofs over them, but are clothed in the bark of trees, feed on nuts, and drink water in their hands. Like those called Encratites in the present day, they know not marriage nor begetting of children. Some, too, of the Indians obey the precepts of Buddha (Βούττα) whom, on account of his extraordinary sanctity, they have raised to divine honours."

Nicolaus of Damascus, and other ancient writers, relate that in AD 13, at the time of Augustus (died AD 14), he met in Antioch (near present day Antakya in Turkey just over 300 miles from Jerusalem) an embassy with a letter written in Greek from the Southern India Pandya Empire was delivered while Caesar was in the Island of Samos. This embassy was  accompanied by a sage who later, naked, anointed and contented, burnt himself to death at Athens. The details of his tomb inscription specified he was a Shramana, "his name was Zarmanochegas", he was an Indian native of Bargosa, and "immortalized himself according to the custom of his country." Cassius Dio and Plutarch cite the same story. Historian Jerry H. Bentley (1993) notes "the possibility that Buddhism influenced the early development of Christianity" and  that scholars "have drawn attention to many parallels concerning the births, lives, doctrines, and deaths of the Buddha and Jesus".

The suggestion that an adult Jesus traveled to India and was influenced by Buddhism before starting his ministry in Galilee was first made by Nicolas Notovitch in 1894 in the book The Unknown Life of Jesus Christ which was widely disseminated and became the basis of other theories. Notovitch's theory was controversial from the beginning and was widely criticized. Once his story had been re-examined by historians, Notovitch confessed to having fabricated the evidence.

Rejections of influence
Most scholars believe there is no historical evidence of any influence by Buddhism on Christianity, Paula Fredriksen stating that no serious scholarly work has placed the origins of Christianity outside the backdrop of 1st century Palestinian Judaism. Leslie Houlden states that although modern parallels between the teachings of Jesus and Buddha have been drawn, these comparisons emerged after missionary contacts in the 19th century and there is no historically reliable evidence of contacts between Buddhism and Jesus.

Other scholars such as Eddy and Boyd state that there is no evidence of a historical influence by outside sources on the authors of the New Testament, and most scholars agree that any such historical influence on Christianity is entirely implausible given that first century monotheistic Galilean Jews would not have been open to what they would have seen as pagan stories. The Macmillan Encyclopedia of Buddhism states that theories of influences of Buddhism on early Christianity are without historical foundation.

Modern scholarship has roundly rejected any historical basis for the travels of Jesus to India or Tibet or influences between the teachings of Christianity and Buddhism, and has seen the attempts at parallel symbolism as cases of parallelomania which exaggerate the importance of trifling resemblances.

There are inherent and fundamental differences between Buddhism and Christianity, one significant element being that while Christianity is at its core monotheistic and relies on a God as a Creator, Buddhism is generally non-theistic and rejects the notion of a Creator God which provides divine values for the world.

The central iconic imagery of the two traditions underscore the difference in their belief structure, when the peaceful death of Gautama Buddha at an old age is contrasted with the harsh image of the crucifixion of Jesus as a willing sacrifice for the atonement for the sins of humanity. Buddhist scholars such as Masao Abe see the centrality of crucifixion in Christianity as an irreconcilable gap between the two belief systems.

Post Apostolic Age

Church Fathers

Clement of Alexandria referred to Buddhists and wrote:

Early 3rd–4th century Christian writers such as Hippolytus and Epiphanius write of one Scythianus who visited India around 50 CE, whence he brought the "doctrine of the Two Principles". Scythianus' pupil Terebinthus supposedly presented himself as a "Buddha" ("he called himself Buddas" Cyril of Jerusalem) and became well known in Judaea and was said to have conversed with the apostles and to have brought books back from his trade with India. The same author says his books and knowledge were taken over by Mani, and became the foundation of the Manichean doctrine.

Saint Jerome (4th century CE) mentions that the Buddhist belief of Buddha's birth from a virgin as their "opinion [...] authoritatively handed down that Budda, the founder of their religion, had his birth through the side of a virgin," (the Buddha was, according to Buddhist tradition, born from the hip of his mother). It has been suggested that this virgin birth legend of Buddhism influenced Christianity.

Gnosticism

Gnosticism comprised a number of small Christian sects which existed in the 2nd-5th centuries, and were rejected by mainstream Christians as heretics. There were some contacts between Gnostics and Indians, e.g. Syrian gnostic theologian Bar Daisan describes in the 3rd century his exchanges with missions of holy men from India (Greek: Σαρμαναίοι, Sramanas), passing through Syria on their way to Elagabalus or another Severan dynasty Roman Emperor. His accounts are quoted by Porphyry (De abstin., iv, 17 ) and Stobaeus (Eccles., iii, 56, 141).

This has given rise to suggestions by Zacharias P. Thundy that Buddhist tradition may have influenced Gnosticism and hence Christianity. Thundy has also considered possible influences through the Jewish sect Therapeutae, which he suggests could have been Buddhists in the first century.

However, Gnosticism was harshly rejected by Christians and c. 180 Irenaeus wrote against them at length in his On the Detection and Overthrow of the So-Called Gnosis, generally called Against Heresies.<ref name=Magill>The Ancient World: Dictionary of World Biography (Vol 1) by Frank N. Magill (Mar 1, 1999)  page 597</ref> By the third century non-Christian Indians were also considered heretics by the Christians who condemned their practices.

Elaine Pagels has encouraged research into the impact of Buddhism on Gnosticism, but she holds that although intriguing, the evidence of any influence is inconclusive. She further concludes that these parallels might be coincidental since parallel traditions may emerge in different cultures.

See also
 Buddhism and Christianity
 Barlaam and Josaphat
 Jingjiao Documents
 List of converts to Buddhism from Christianity
 Nestorian Stele

References

Notes

Sources

 Johnston, William, S.J., Christian Zen, Harper & Row, 1971. 
 Leaney, A.R.C., ed., A Guide to the Scrolls, Nottingham Studies on the Qumran Discoveries, SCM Book Club, Naperville, Ill., 1958.
 Lefebure, Leo D., The Buddha and the Christ, Explorations in Buddhist and Christian Dialogue'' (Faith Meets Faith Series), Orbis Books, Maryknoll, New York, 1993.
 
 India in Primitive Christianity, Kegan House Paul, Trench, Trübner & Co., 1909.
 Lopez, Donald S. & Rockefeller, Steven C., eds., The Christ and the Bodhisattva, State University of New York, 1987. Phan, Peter, ed., Christianity and the Wider Ecumenism, Paragon House, New York, 1990.
 Siegmund, Georg, Buddhism and Christianity, A Preface to Dialogue, Sister Mary Frances McCarthy, trans., University of Alabama Press, 1968.
 Yu, Chai-shin, Early Buddhism and Christianity, A comparative Study of the Founders' Authority, the Community, and the Discipline, Motilal Banarsidass, Delhi, 1981.

External links 
 Dalai Lama questions on Buddhism & Christianity

Buddhism and Christianity
Buddhism in the ancient Mediterranean
Greco-Buddhism
Ancient Christianity